USCGC Legare (WMEC-912) is a United States Coast Guard medium endurance cutter. Legare was laid down July 11, 1986 at Robert Derecktor Shipyard Incorporated of Middletown, Rhode Island. She was named for Hugh Swinton Legare, a former United States Attorney General under President John Tyler. Legare was delivered December 1, 1989 and was commissioned August 4, 1990 at her homeport of Portsmouth, Virginia.

In 2009 the Legare participated in joint patrols with vessels of African nations.

References

External links
 Legare home page

Ships of the United States Coast Guard
Famous-class cutters
Ships built in Middletown, Rhode Island
1989 ships